Sergey Kinyakin (born 6 October 1961) is a rower from Belarus who competed for the Soviet Union.

References 
 
 

1961 births
Living people
Belarusian male rowers
Rowers at the 1988 Summer Olympics
Rowers at the 1992 Summer Olympics
Rowers at the 1996 Summer Olympics
Olympic rowers of the Unified Team
Olympic rowers of the Soviet Union
Soviet male rowers
World Rowing Championships medalists for the Soviet Union